Mohammad Mokhber Dezfuli (born 1955) is an Iranian politician who is the 7th and current first vice president of Iran since 8 August 2021. He is also currently a member of the Expediency Discernment Council. He was former head of the Execution of Imam Khomeini's Order (EIKO), the chairman of board at Sina Bank and deputy governor of Khuzestan Province. He was born in Dezful, Iran.

Early life and education
Mohammad Mokhber was born in 1955. He possesses two doctoral degrees, including a doctorate academic paper (and a MA) in the subject of "international rights"; he has also a doctorate degree in the subject of management. As well as doctoral, Mokhber holds a MA in management field, too.

Sanction 
In July 2010, the European Union included Mohammad Mokhber, president of Setad (Execution of Imam Khomeini's Order), in a list of persons and entities it was sanctioning for alleged involvement in the issue of “nuclear or ballistic missiles activities.” After passing two years, this sanction removed Mokhber from the mentioned list.

See also 
 Mohammad Reza Mokhber Dezfouli

References

External links

1955 births
Living people
Iranian bankers
People from Dezful
Iranian politicians
Iranian individuals subject to the U.S. Department of the Treasury sanctions